Medical Research Council may refer to:

 Medical Research Council (Ireland), forerunner of the Health Research Board
 Medical Research Council (United Kingdom), responsible for coordinating and funding medical research in the United Kingdom.
 National Health and Medical Research Council, Australia's peak funding body for medical research
 South African Medical Research Council, a state medical research organization in South Africa

See also

 Medical Council